Rosemary Brown is an American politician. A Republican, she is member of the Pennsylvania State Senate representing the 40th district since 2023. She previously served as a member of the Pennsylvania House of Representatives representing the 189th district from 2011-2022.

Biography 

Brown has resided in the Poconos for 37 years and is a member of St. John's Parish, which is located in East Stroudsburg.  Brown graduated from East Stroudsburg High School and holds a bachelor's degree in Communications from the University of Scranton.

Brown currently resides in Middle Smithfield Township with her husband Joe and their three children.

Prior to becoming a legislator, Brown worked as an assistant buyer for Macy's, and as an executive sales manager for Macy’s, Saks Fifth Avenue, and The Bon-Ton stores.  Brown then began working in pharmaceutical sales for Hoffmann-La Roche and Vistakon, which is a branch of Johnson & Johnson.

The 2019-20 legislative session marks her fifth term representing the people of the 189th District in the Pennsylvania House of Representatives. She was first elected to represent the district on Nov. 2, 2010. She was sworn into her first term on January 4, 2011.

During the current session, Rosemary is serving her first term as a deputy whip for the House Republican Caucus. Additionally, she serves as a member of the House Appropriations, Education, Professional Licensure and Transportation committees.

Brown announced she would run for the Pennsylvania State Senate and not seek re-election to the House in 2022.

References

External links
 Pennsylvania House of Representatives – Rosemary M. Brown Official Pennsylvania House website
 Pennsylvania House Republican Caucus – State Representative Rosemary Brown Official party website

Living people
1970 births
Republican Party members of the Pennsylvania House of Representatives
University of Scranton alumni
People from East Stroudsburg, Pennsylvania
21st-century American politicians
Republican Party Pennsylvania state senators